Aesopus is a genus of sea snails, marine gastropod mollusks in the family Columbellidae, the dove snails.

Species
Species within the genus Aesopus include:

 Aesopus algoensis (G.B. Sowerby III, 1892)
 Aesopus aliciae Marincovich, 1973
 Aesopus arestus Dall, 1919
 Aesopus australis (Angas, 1877)
 Aesopus benitoensis deMaintenon, 2019
 Aesopus cassandra (Hedley, 1904)
 Aesopus chrysalloideus (Carpenter, 1866)
 Aesopus clausiliformis (Kiener, 1834)
 Aesopus cumingii (Reeve, 1859)
 Aesopus eurytoides (Carpenter, 1864)
 Aesopus fredbakeri Pilsbry & Lowe, 1932
 Aesopus fuscostrigatus (Carpenter, 1864)
 Aesopus geraldsmithi Lussi M., 2001
 Aesopus goforthi Dall, 1912
 Aesopus gracilis Faber, 2004
 Aesopus guyanensis Pelorce, 2017
 Aesopus hilium Hedley, 1908
 Aesopus jaffaensis (Verco, 1910)
 Aesopus japonicus Gould, 1860
 Aesopus meta (Thiele, 1925)
 Aesopus multistriatus (Preston, 1905)
 Aesopus myrmecoon Dall, 1916
 Aesopus obesus (Hinds, 1844)
 Aesopus osborni Hertlein & Strong, 1951
 Aesopus pallidulus (Hedley, 1906)
 Aesopus plurisulcatus Reeve, 1859
 Aesopus rotundus Drivas & Jay, 1990
 Aesopus sanctus Dall, 1919
 Aesopus stearnsii (Tryon, 1883)
 Aesopus subturritus (Carpenter, 1866)
 Aesopus urania Melvill & Standen, 1901
 Aesopus veneris (Thiele, 1925)

Species brought into synonymy
 Aesopus angustus (G.B. Sowerby III, 1886): synonym of Clathranachis angusta (G.B. Sowerby III, 1886)
 Aesopus eurytoideus (Carpenter, 1864): synonym of Aesopus eurytoides (Carpenter, 1864)
 Aesopus filosus Angas, 1867: synonym of Aesopus plurisulcatus Reeve, 1859
 Aesopus metcalfei (Reeve, 1858): synonym of Aesopus obesus (Hinds, 1844)
 Aesopus metella (Thiele, 1925): synonym of Decipifus metellus (Thiele, 1925)
 Aesopus spiculus (Duclos in Chenu, 1846): synonym of Aesopus clausiliformis (Kiener, 1834)
 Aesopus xenicus Pilsbry & Lowe, 1932: synonym of Glyptaesopus xenicus (Pilsbry & H. N. Lowe, 1932) (original combination)

References

Columbellidae
Gastropod genera